Keavy-Jane Elizabeth Annie Lynch (born 15 December 1979) is an Irish singer. She is best known for being a member of the girl group B*Witched, of which her twin sister Edele is also a member.

Early life and education
Keavy was born to Brendan and Noeleen Lynch, a mechanic and housewife, respectively, and raised in Donaghmede, North-east Dublin. Keavy is one of six children and her brother Shane is also a member of boy band Boyzone.

Before B*Witched, Keavy worked as a part-time trainee car mechanic at her father's garage.

In an interview, Edele talked about her bond with her twin: "She's the greatest gift I've ever been given, and I think a lot of identical twins would say that. She really is my other half, and I'm not the same without her. We've worked together most of our lives and when we looked back on when B*Witched split and we went our separate ways for the first time, that was like our first day at school. I missed her."

Music career

In 1997, Keavy and Edele formed the girl group Butterfly Farm with their friend Sinéad O'Carroll. They began writing and recording together, but soon realised that there was "someone missing". Upon Keavy's suggestion, they asked Lindsay Armaou to audition and she played a tape recording of a song she had written. The other girls liked it and Lindsay became the fourth member of the band, who later changed their name to B*Witched.

After B*Witched split in 2002, Keavy remained somewhat active in the music industry, forming Ziiiing!, a production and songwriting company, with musical partner Alex Toms. In 2011, she and Edele formed a new group, Barbarellas. Keavy is also a party and function singer with The Collection/The Monaco Band.

In 2012, B*Witched, 911, Five, Atomic Kitten, Honeyz and Liberty X reunited for the ITV2 reality-documentary series The Big Reunion.

Stage career

Keavy took the lead role in a pantomime performance of Snow White in December 2005 at the Theatre Royal in Nottingham. Keavy returned to the stage in 2015, appearing as a forest sprite in Robin Hood And The Babes In The Wood at Woodville Halls Theatre, Gravesend.

Counselling career

In 2014, Keavy completed a degree, BSc Reflective Therapeutic Practice to become a qualified humanistic counsellor. Her practice is located in Kingston upon Thames.

Keavy is patron of a mental health charity, Stand Down which offers counselling to those who suffer mental trauma as a result of military service. Keavy said "I am very excited and feel honoured to be a patron for Stand Down. I think it is a service that is very much needed and a service that these men and women deserve. I may not agree with war but these men and woman are risking their lives everyday fighting for the country I live in and I am grateful for that."

Personal life

In 2007, Keavy admitted that when B*Witched split up after the group was dropped by their record company, she suffered from depression and contemplated suicide. In 2011, Keavy said "I don't suffer from depression now. It was that one time, but it lasted for way too many years. I should have got help." In May 2017, Keavy married her partner of two years Nathaniel Comer. In September 2017, the couple were expecting their first child. On January 31, 2018, Keavy gave birth to their daughter, Freya. On 29 October 2020, Keavy gave birth to twins Felix and Elàna.

References

External links
 Keavy Lynch Counselling
 

Irish pop singers
People from Donaghmede
1979 births
Living people
Irish twins
21st-century Irish singers
21st-century Irish women singers
B*Witched members
Twin musicians